Greenbrier High School is a 5-A high school located in Evans, Georgia, a suburb of Augusta, Georgia, United States.

For the 2010–11 school year, Greenbrier High School enrolled more than 1,600 students in grades 9 through 12.

The school mascot is "Wolfie Wolfman" and the school colors are deep green, gold, and white.

Athletics
Greenbrier competed in the AAA classification from its founding in 1996 through 2000, in the AAAA classification from 2001–2009 and 2011–12, and in the AAAAA classification from 2009–10 and again since 2013.
Baseball (boys) state champions in 1997–1999, 2006–2007, and 2014–2015
Soccer (boys and girls)
Softball state champions in 2004 and 2014
Football
Basketball
Cross Country
Track and Field
Tennis
E-sports
Lacrosse
Volleyball
Golf
Fishing
Wrestling
Flag Football
Swimming

Notable alumni
 Brandon Cumpton, professional baseball player
 Nick Sandlin, professional baseball player

References

External links

 
 Columbia County Board of Education

High schools in Columbia County, Georgia
Educational institutions established in 1996
Public high schools in Georgia (U.S. state)
1996 establishments in Georgia (U.S. state)